The Hastings Constitutional Law Quarterly is a quarterly law review covering constitutional law edited by students of the University of California, Hastings College of the Law. While most articles focus on issues arising under the United States Constitution, the journal also covers topics concerning state and foreign constitutions. It was established in 1973.

Notable Articles 

 David Shelledy, Autonomy, Debate, and Corporate Speech, 18 HASTINGS CONST. L.Q. 541 (1991). Cited in the dissent authored by U.S. Supreme Court Justice Stevens, joined by Justices Ginsburg, Breyer, and Sotomayor in Citizens United v. FEC, 558 U.S. 310 (2010).
 Julie M. Spanbauer, The First Amendment Right to Petition Government for a Redress of Grievances: Cut from a Different Cloth, 21 HASTINGS CONST. L.Q. 15 (1993). Cited by the American Civil Liberties Union and American Association for Justice in Amici Curiae briefs.
 Joseph R. Grodin, Rediscovering the State Constitutional Right to Happiness and Safety, 25 HASTINGS CONST. L.Q. 1 (1997). Cited by the Supreme Courts of California, Iowa and New Mexico. 
 Neal Kumar Katyal, The Promise and Precondition of Educational Autonomy, 31 HASTINGS CONST. L.Q. 1 (1997). Cited by Howard University School of Law Civil Rights Clinic as Amicus Curiae.
 Jamila Jefferson-Jones, Airbnb and the Housing Segment of the Modern 'Sharing Economy': Are Short-Term Rental Restrictions an Unconstitutional Taking? 42 HASTINGS CONST. L.Q. 557 (2015). Cited by the Supreme Court of New York.

References

External links 
 

Law journals
Quarterly journals
Publications established in 1973
English-language journals
University of California, Berkeley
Law journals edited by students
Constitutional law journals